Agnew Lake is a lake on the Spanish River in the Sudbury District, Ontario, Canada.

The lake is located primarily in the municipalities of Sables-Spanish Rivers, Baldwin and Nairn and Hyman, although its easternmost end enters the city limits of Greater Sudbury near High Falls.

The lake has been the site of varied mining activity, including drilling for diamonds in the earlier half of the 20th century and for uranium from 1977 to 1983 at Agnew Lake Mine.

The lake was named after John Lyons Agnew, who became president and general manager of INCO in 1921.

Fauna
Fish species found in Agnew Lake include:
 Burbot
 Lake whitefish
 Northern pike
 Smallmouth bass
 Rock bass
 Walleye
 White sucker
 Yellow perch

Northern pike, smallmouth bass, and walleye have consumption advisories due to mercury contamination.

See also
List of lakes in Ontario

References

Lakes of Greater Sudbury
Lakes of Sudbury District
Spanish River (Ontario)